The Grapes is a Grade II listed public house situated directly on the north bank of the Thames in London's Limehouse area, with a veranda overlooking the water. To its landward side, the pub is found at number 76 in Narrow Street, flanked by former warehouses now converted to residential and other uses.

The Grapes is owned in partnership by the actor Sir Ian McKellen, the theatre and film director Sean Mathias, and Evgeny Lebedev, publisher of the Evening Standard newspaper.

History 
The current building dates from the 1720s and is on the site of a pub built in 1583. It was formerly a working-class tavern serving the dockers of the Limehouse Basin. In the 1930s it sold beer from the adjacent brewery owned by Taylor Walker. It survived the intense bombing of the area in World War II, and is just outside the Docklands commercial zone built in the 1980s.

Local area 

Limehouse was settled early as a dry bank suitable for growing, easy building upon and import, export, chandlery and fishing—most of many times wider Poplar to the east was the low-lying fields of the Isle of Dogs used for the keeping of marsh sheep with the national markets in the City just west. To the west before the City were the similar small wharf and early built-up 'Tower Division of Middlesex hamlets' of Ratcliff, Shadwell, Wapping and St Katherine by the Tower each with their own urban settlements; together with Limehouse covering no more than a square mile in total. From directly below The Grapes, Sir Walter Raleigh set sail on his third voyage to the New World.

In 1661, Samuel Pepys' diary records his trip to lime kilns at the jetty just along from The Grapes.

Artistic references
In 1820, the young Charles Dickens visited his godfather in Limehouse and knew the district well for 40 years. The Grapes appears, scarcely disguised, in the opening chapter of his novel Our Mutual Friend:

A tavern of dropsical appearance ... long settled down into a state of hale infirmity. It had outlasted many a sprucer public house, indeed the whole house impended over the water but seemed to have got into the condition of a faint-hearted diver, who has paused so long on the brink that he will never go in at all.

Other popular writers were drawn by huddled buildings, wharves and docks by the bustling river: Oscar Wilde in The Picture of Dorian Gray; Arthur Conan Doyle, who sent Sherlock Holmes in search of opium provided by the local Chinese immigrants; and, more recently, Peter Ackroyd in Dan Leno and the Limehouse Golem.

Narrow Street is also associated with distinguished painters. Francis Bacon lived and worked at No. 80, and Edward Wolfe at No. 96. James McNeill Whistler painted a Nocturne of Limehouse. On The Grapes' walls are an oil painting, Limehouse Barge Builders, by the marine artist Napier Hemy; watercolours of Limehouse Reach by Louise Hardy; and Dickens at The Grapes by the New Zealand artist Nick Cuthell.

See also
Prospect of Whitby

References

External links 

 Official website
 The Grapes at Fancyapint.com

Pubs in the London Borough of Tower Hamlets
1583 establishments in England
Commercial buildings completed in 1720
Grade II listed buildings in the London Borough of Tower Hamlets
Limehouse
Grade II listed pubs in London